Robyn Jones Horner (born Robyn Leigh Jones; January 1, 1985) is an American soccer player. She is a goalkeeper. Jones previously played two years for the Philadelphia Independence of Women's Professional Soccer. The 2015 season marked Jones' fourth season with the Charlotte Lady Eagles.

Jones grew up in the Titusville section of Hopewell Township, Mercer County, New Jersey and played high school soccer at The Pennington School.

References

External links
Philadelphia Independence player profile

Rutgers profile

1985 births
Living people
American women's soccer players
Philadelphia Independence players
Rutgers Scarlet Knights women's soccer players
Sportspeople from Mercer County, New Jersey
Sportspeople from Roseburg, Oregon
Franklin & Marshall Diplomats women's soccer players
Soccer players from New Jersey
Soccer players from Oregon
Women's association football goalkeepers
People from Hopewell Township, Mercer County, New Jersey
The Pennington School alumni
National Women's Soccer League players
Charlotte Lady Eagles players
USL W-League (1995–2015) players